Merlins Bridge are a Welsh football club from Haverfordwest, Pembrokeshire in the southwest of Wales. They currently play in the Pembrokeshire League Division One. They are one of the league's most successful clubs, having since the 1945–46 season, won the Division One championship eleven times.

History

Honours

 Pembrokeshire League Division One  - Champions (11): 1978–79; 1979–80; 1987–88; 1988–89; 1990–91; 1992–93; 1994–95; 1995–96; 2007–08; 2009–10; 2011–12
 Pembrokeshire League Division One  - Runners-Up (8): 1977–78; 1980–81; 1989–90; 1991–92; 2005–06; 2014–15; 2016–17; 2018–19
 Pembrokeshire League Division Two  - Champions (2): 1977–78 (reserves); 1986–87; 
 Pembrokeshire League Division Two  - Runners-Up (4): 1966–67; 1968–69 (reserves); 1973–74; 2018–19 (reserves)
 Pembrokeshire League Division Three  - Runners-Up (4): 1965–66; 1976–77 (reserves); 1991–92 (reserves); 2015–16 (reserves)
 Pembrokeshire League Division Four – Champions: 1987–88 (reserves)
 Pembrokeshire League Division Five – Champions: 1986–87 (reserves)
 Pembrokeshire League Reserves Division One - Champions (3): 2004–05 (reserves); 2005–06 (reserves); 2007–08 (reserves)
 Pembrokeshire League Reserves Division One - Runners-Up (4): 1995–96 (reserves); 1998–99 (reserves); 2002–03 (reserves); 2006–07 (reserves)
 Pembrokeshire Senior Cup - Winners (9):  1977–78; 1978–79; 1979–80; 1986–87; 1989–90; 1995–96; 2003–04; 2016–17; 2018–19
 Pembrokeshire Senior Cup - Runners-Up (6):  1969–70; 1992–93; 1994–95; 2008–09; 2009–10; 2013–14
West Wales Intermediate Challenge Cup - Winners: 2018–19

References

External links
Official club Facebook
Official club Twitter

Football clubs in Wales
Sport in Pembrokeshire
Pembrokeshire League clubs
Haverfordwest